Aayirathil Oruvan is a 2010 Indian Tamil-language action-adventure film written and directed by Selvaraghavan and produced by R. Ravindran. The film stars Karthi, Reemma Sen and Andrea Jeremiah with Parthiban playing a pivotal role. It revolves around three characters, Muthu (Karthi), Lavanya (Andrea Jeremiah) and  Anitha (Reemma Sen) who embark on an adventure to search for a missing archaeologist. It is inspired loosely by the historical decline of the Tamil Chola dynasty and the rise of the Tamil Pandya dynasty.

The film's principal photography commenced in July 2007, and continued till 2008; shooting of the film took place in various locations with 2,000 extras in areas including Chalakudy, Kerala and Jaisalmer, Rajasthan, and also filmed in Ramoji Film City in Hyderabad. The title Aayirathil Oruvan is taken from the 1965 film of the same name. The cinematography was handled by Ramji and editing work is done by Kola Bhaskar. The film's background score and soundtrack album is composed by G. V. Prakash Kumar, replacing Selvaraghavan's usual collaborator Yuvan Shankar Raja, whom he composed for his earlier films. The soundtrack received rave critical acclaim and emerged as one of the composer's best works till date.

The film languished in development hell due to slow progress of the shoot and the extensive pre-and post-production works, evading release dates ranging one year, Aayirathil Oruvan was released during the Thai Pongal festival, on 14 January 2010. The distribution rights were bought by Ayngaran International. Though the original film length was 181 minutes, it was then trimmed to 154 minutes for the theatrical release. 

Upon release, the film garnered critical acclaim from both the critics and audience, alike. However, the film developed a cult status over the following years. At the 58th Filmfare Awards South, the film won Best Supporting Actor award for R. Parthiepan.

Plot

In 1279 A.D., the downfall of the Chola dynasty seems imminent as the Pandyas drive the Chola people out of their kingdom in southern India. To escape them and save the life of his successor, the Chola emperor sends his son, his royal advisor (Raja Guru), and the remaining Chola people to a secret territory. The refugees take along an idol sacred to the Pandyas, angering them. To capture the escaped Cholas and the stolen idol, the Pandyas extend their invasion to unexplored territories, but are unable to find them.

Centuries later, in 2008, Indian archaeologists are searching for the secret land of the lost Chola group using clues left by the ancient Pandyan warriors, but the searchers always disappear. After the sudden disappearance of archaeologist Chandramouli, the government organizes a search expedition led by the cruel and arrogant officer Anitha to find him and what became of the Cholas. She is assisted by a detachment of the Indian army led by Ravisekharan. They recruit Chandramouli's estranged daughter, the aloof and quiet archaeologist Lavanya. She supplies crucial documents about the Chola dynasty prepared by her father, which contain route information. Anitha also employs a group of porters headed by Muthu, who she and the army continually ill-treat.

The expedition arrives at an island called Min-gua, on the borders of Vietnam, Thailand, and Malaysia. There they face seven traps set by the Cholas: sea creatures, which they flee from; cannibals, who cannot eat them as long as they do not look them in the face; warriors whose land they invade and who they brutally kill; snakes; hunger; quicksand; and a village. Many porters and soldiers die, Anitha forcing the porters, who she had not warned of the dangers, to carry on and emotionally manipulating Muthu into not retreating by insulting his masculinity.

Muthu, Anitha and Lavanya then become separated from the others. They reach a ruined village, where they realize that someone is following them. Under the influence of black magic, they are almost driven mad, and surrender to the follower, who reveals himself as the aged Raja Guru, the royal advisor who was sent away 800 years ago. The Chola people have become an ethnically isolated primitive Tamil group ruled by Rajendra Chola III. They are living in poverty and suffering from drought while awaiting the arrival of the messenger who, it is foretold, will lead them back to their motherland of Thanjavur. When Muthu, Anitha, and Lavanya strip in front of themselves in front of the Raja Guru, a tattoo of a tiger is revealed on Muthu's back.

After Muthu, Anitha, and Lavanya are revived to consciousness by the Raja Guru, other priests and physicians. Consulting the gods for omens, the king and priests are told that one of them is a Chola, one is a Pandya, and one is a commoner. The king and Raja Guru hypnotize Muthu, attempting to have him reveal himself as the messenger, but the king rejects the possibility because of Muthu's appearance and his incoherent babbling, and orders all three to be burnt alive as sacrifices.

At this point Anitha suddenly pricks herself and uses her blood to perform black magic. She tells the king that she is the messenger. All the Chola people are ecstatic. Muthu and Lavanya are enslaved.

Unbeknownst to the Chola people, it is revealed to the audience that Anitha's account of her ancestry reveals her true identity as a descendant of the Pandya Dynasty. On glimpsing the Pandyas' sacred idol, she cries out. The minister sponsoring the expedition and Army officer Ravishekaran, who escaped the traps and is the sole survivor of the expeditionary force, are also revealed to be Pandyas. Anitha attempts to seduce the king and to persuade him to march immediately to the homeland so he can be formally crowned there, but he grows suspicious since her actions do not match the traditions about the messenger. The prophecy was that on arrival, the messenger will be beaten, it will rain, and finally, he will console the destitute. Giving up on persuading the king, Anitha attempts to kill the Raja Guru and poisons the wells, then hypnotizes a Chola girl into passing information to Ravishekaran, who returns with reinforcements. The king, horrified that he ever believed in her, realizes that Muthu is the true messenger. The Raja Guru gives all of his magical powers, including invisibility and invulnerability, to Muthu and dies.

The Cholas fight bravely against Ravishekaran's troops but are overwhelmed by modern technology. Rajendra Chola III and his people are taken prisoners, their women raped by the soldiers. The king dies, and the remaining enslaved Cholas drown themselves in the sea with his body. Muthu then breaks free from his shackles, and saves the king's son, the last remaining heir of Chola dynasty. Using the powers given to him by the Raja Guru, he escapes from Anitha and the army with the Chola prince, presumably to India, thus fulfilling the prophecy that the messenger will take the seed of Chola dynasty to their homeland.

Cast 
 Karthi as Muthu, a porter from Chennai
 Reema Sen as Anitha Pandiyan (Nambirattiyaar), an intelligence officer
 Andrea Jeremiah as archaeologist Lavanya Chandramouli
 R. Parthiban as Meignanandha Sivapaadha Sekara Chozhar, a descendant of Rajendra Chola III and a king of the Chola dynasty in exile. Parthiepan signed for the role after much speculation that Dhanush would be selected.
 Pratap K. Pothen as Chandramouli, an archaeologist and father of Lavanya Chandramouli
 Azhagam Perumal as army officer Ravisekharan
 Crane Manohar as Muthu's uncle
 V.Nambirajan as Chola's Rajaguru
 Abhinaya as daughter of Chola king
 Mathan as Uncredited Role Side Soldier

Production

Development
After the reception to his 2007 gangster film, Pudhupettai, Selvaraghavan took a sabbatical to plan future projects and set up a production company, White Elephants, whose first project Idhu Maalai Nerathu Mayakkam started in November 2006. The film was co-produced by new producer R. Ravindran, and the first schedule began with Karthi, whose first film, Paruthiveeran, was awaiting release, and Sandhya. The film was stalled in early 2007 due to cinematographer Arvind Krishna's decision to leave White Elephants and the project was eventually shelved. In July 2007, Selvaraghavan announced a new film with a new team of Karthi and Reemma Sen in the cast, with Ramji replacing regular Arvind Krishna as the cinematographer. It was Sen's first venture into this genre following a series of roles in commercial projects. Erum Ali, wife of actor Abbas, became the team's head costume designer, whilst Selvaraghavan's sister-in-law and Rajinikanth's daughter, Aishwarya Dhanush, was signed on as an associate director. The film was named after a popular M. G. Ramachandran film, Aayirathil Oruvan. The producer was announced to be R. Ravindran whilst Yuvan Shankar Raja was appointed as music director following five previous successful soundtracks in Selvaraghavan films. Despite early indications that the director's brother Dhanush was going to play a guest role, the role was given to R. Parthiepan. Andrea Jeremiah was also signed for a role in the film in October 2007, in her second film after Pachaikili Muthucharam, and director-actor Azhagam Perumal followed suit in November 2007.

Filming and post-production
After extensive development and pre-production which took four months for scripting, the film started the first schedule in the forests of Chalakudy in Kerala with Karthi, Reemma Sen and Andrea during October 2007. Shooting took place in various locations throughout India  also including Kerala and Jaisalmer, Rajasthan. The project developed a reputation for its gruelling shoots, a novel concept in Tamil films, at an early stage of production. Thirty-five days into the shoot, Selvaraghavan gave a statement that the film was forty percent over and the film should release by May 2008 whilst also mentioning that rains in Kerala had led to the budget going over expectations two months into the project. In January 2008, the unit moved to Jaisalmer in Rajasthan to shoot in the deserts in the region, but they were delayed again by unseasonal rains. Missing its original release date, the film's progress carried on through 2008, with shooting occurring towards the end of the year inside sets at Ramoji Film City in Hyderabad. In the studios, choreographer Shivshankar composed a classical dance for Reemma Sen and Parthiepan, and the sequence was shot over twenty days. Shooting carried on in sets for three more months with second half scenes being recorded. Shoots in all regions were tough and demanding for the crew as the film featured more than three thousand junior artistes from a variety of unions across India, with the language barrier becoming a problem.

Eighteen months into shooting, the project began to face questions about its progress, with the producer, Ravindran, complaining to the Tamil Film Producers Council that Karthi was trying to change his look for his next film, Paiyaa, following the long period he had spent with Aayirathil Oruvan. In February 2009, filming was completed after 263 days of shooting; therefore the producers signaled for a summer release but it was postponed by six months.

When asked by the media during production about the lengthy shooting, the lead actor said that the cast had also been unaware of how long the film's shoot was going to carry on. Reemma Sen originally signed for forty days whilst Andrea Jeremiah signed for three months, without knowing that the film would eventually take 263 days of filming. Furthermore, Parthiepan claimed to have been signed for forty days, whilst his segment lasted up to 140 days.

In March 2008, after filming had already begun, music director Yuvan Shankar Raja was ousted from the project due to differences of opinion. G. V. Prakash Kumar succeeded him; it was his biggest project to that point. Rambo Rajkumar, the film's stunt director, died in April 2009 and was posthumously praised for his action choreography. Soon after the filming finished, the lead actors moved onto other projects, as did Selvaraghavan whilst post-production continued. During production, news websites had linked Selvaraghavan romantically with Andrea Jeremiah, to the pair's displeasure; in August 2009, he divorced his wife, Sonia Agarwal. During the period, G. V. Prakash Kumar and Selva also worked on the music in Mumbai whilst re-recording was also held in Austria and London.

Aayirathil Oruvan languished in production hell due to slow progress of the shoot and the extensive pre- and post-production works, with release dates being postponed for a total of a year. During its release, the film's budget was reported to be  crore. However, in August 2021, Selvaraghavan stated that the film's actual budget was  crore and they had announced an inflated budget to create hype.

Music

The film was announced in 2007 with Selvaraghavan's regular music director, Yuvan Shankar Raja, following five successive successful albums together, but after his ouster during filming, work for the soundtrack began again from scratch under new music director G. V. Prakash Kumar. "Adada Vaa", the only song composed by Yuvan Shankar Raja for the film, was removed after his departure and instead used in Sarvam,. As 
Selvaraghavan had already filmed the visuals for that song, Prakash Kumar had to match the visuals and the choreography. "Un Mela Aasadhan", which he composed as the replacement, was noted for sounding similar to "Adada Vaa".

The album was well received. It features ten tunes; six songs, two alternate versions and another two theme songs, with vocals from singers Karthik, Vijay Yesudas, Bombay Jayashri, Nithyasree Mahadevan and P. B. Sreenivas, who made a comeback to playback singing with his song. Moreover, Dhanush and Aishwarya sang for the album along with the composer, Prakash Kumar and Andrea Jeremiah. Lyrics for the songs were written by Vairamuthu, Veturi, Selvaraghavan and Andrea Jeremiah. For a song set in the thirteenth century, research was carried out to find instruments used during that period. A Yaazh, a melodic instrument used in the Sangam Period, and a horn made from animal horns from Bhutan were used.

The soundtrack to Aayirathil Oruvan was released on 4 November 2009 at a University Auditorium in Chennai, in a critically praised event. Prominent film personalities across the South Indian film industry attended the launch, which became one of the first films to play live music at the audio launch. It featured live performances from G. V. Prakash Kumar and Andrea Jeremiah for several songs, as well as songs from Dhanush and Aishwarya Dhanush. Furthermore, the night featured a fashion show from Erum Ali, a Kalari performance, Chenda Melam by women from Kerala, a classical dance performance by an actress Poorna and choreographed by Sivashankar. The soundtrack garnered critical acclaim and was considered Prakash Kumar's finest work to date. Furthermore, shortly after the music release, an album success meet was held on 20 November 2009.

In the film, only five songs from the album are used in their entirety. Moreover, one song in the film, not included in the soundtrack, is the original version of "Atho Andha Paravai" from the 1965 film Aayirathil Oruvan, which was bought from the original copyright holders of the song in December 2007. The film's picturisation of the three exploring the ruins of the fallen kingdom in the song, were praised.

Release
Aayirathil Oruvan is considered as one of the longest films in Tamil cinema, with an original running time of 181 minutes (3 hours, 1 minute). However, the film's runtime was reduced to 154 minutes (2 hours, 34 minutes), in order to avert difficulties faced during the theatrical release. Towards the end of the year, the film began to announce release date of Christmas which was later further delayed to coincide with the Pongal festival. A date clash occurred with Karthi's Paiyaa, with an eventual hearing leading to the Karthi's latter film being delayed. Throughout December 2009, release work began with a trailer and promotional songs being released on 13 December. The film was subsequently certified before the end of the year by the Central Board of Film Certification and settled with an adult rating, after Selvaraghavan refused to remove some gory scenes. It received a 12A rating from British Board of Film Classification.

Reception

Critical response 
Sify cited that the film represented "something new in the placid world of Tamil cinema", adding that it "broke away from the shackles of the stereotypes". Selvaraghavan also was praised by the reviewer with claims that "the director transports us to a whole new world and at the end of it all, we are dumb struck by the visuals, the packaging and the new way of storytelling". Rediff.com gave the film 3.5 out of 5, claiming that viewers should "steel [their] stomach before [they] watch it" and "regardless of the minor discrepancies, AO is definitely a movie to watch".,

Box office 
Released in 600 screens worldwide, Aayirathil Oruvan was declared a "hit" in Telugu and an "average" in Tamil. It took the biggest opening by a considerable distance earning  on its opening weekend in Chennai. In the United Kingdom, the film opened across 7 screens and grossed £29,517 ($44,868) in the opening week. The film, distributed by Ayngaran International opened at 22nd place. The film grossed $440,000 in Malaysia, while opening in seventh. The film was also dubbed in Telugu as Yuganiki Okkadu. Similarly, the Telugu dubbed version of the film which released on 5 February, took a strong opening. The Telugu version released across 93 screens across Andhra Pradesh&Telangana and grossed  on its opening weekend.

Awards

Sequel 
On 1 January 2021, Selvaraghavan released the first-look poster for the sequel Aayirathil Oruvan 2, confirming that it starred Dhanush. A character sketch of his role was released by Dhanush through his Twitter page. It is scheduled for release in 2024.

References

External links
 
 
 

2010 films
2010s Tamil-language films
2010s action adventure films
Apocalyptic films
Indian action adventure films
Films directed by Selvaraghavan
Films scored by G. V. Prakash Kumar
Films set in ancient India
Indian Army in films
Films shot in Chalakudy
Films shot in Rajasthan
Films set in forests
Films set in deserts
Films shot in Hyderabad, India
Films about royalty
Indian epic films
Films set in the Chola Empire
Films set in the 13th century
Fiction about regicide
Films about death games
Films set in the Pandyan Empire
Fiction set in the 1270s
Films set in Vietnam
Films set on fictional islands
Films about cannibalism
Films shot in Thrissur